Royal Flight may refer to:

 Royal Canadian Air Force VIP aircraft, air transport for the Canadian Royal Family and other VIPs in Canada
 No. 32 Squadron RAF, the air transport provider for the British Royal Family and other VIPs in the United Kingdom
 Royal Flight (airline), a Russian charter airline based at Moscow Vnukovo Airport